Potterhanworth railway station is a former railway station in Potterhanworth, Lincolnshire. It was on the still-open line between Lincoln and Sleaford.

References

Disused railway stations in Lincolnshire
Former Great Northern and Great Eastern Joint Railway stations
Railway stations in Great Britain opened in 1882
Railway stations in Great Britain closed in 1955